Carl Carlswärd (born Carl-Lennart Karlsvärd born 27 October 1949, in Stockholm) is a Swedish actor.

Selected filmography
1986 – Ormens väg på hälleberget
1988 – Kråsnålen (TV)
1989 – Tre kärlekar (TV)
1991 – Sunes jul (TV)
1992 – En komikers uppväxt (TV)
1993 – Rederiet (TV)
1994 – Den vite riddaren (TV)
1997 – Beck – Lockpojken
1999 – Jakten på en mördare
2003 – Tusenbröder (TV)
2011 – Tjuvarnas jul (TV, Julkalendern)
2016 – Selmas saga (TV, Julkalendern)

References

External links

Carl Carlswärd on Swedish Film Database

Living people
1949 births
Male actors from Stockholm